Arachosia is a genus of anyphaenid sac spiders that was first described by Octavius Pickard-Cambridge in 1882.

Species
 it contains twenty-one species, found in the Americas, including the Greater Antilles:
Arachosia albiventris Mello-Leitão, 1922 – Brazil, Argentina
Arachosia anyphaenoides O. Pickard-Cambridge, 1882 (type) – Brazil
Arachosia arachosia Mello-Leitão, 1922 – Venezuela, Brazil
Arachosia avalosi Rubio & Ramírez, 2015 – Brazil, Argentina
Arachosia bergi (Simon, 1880) – Brazil, Uruguay, Argentina
Arachosia bifasciata (Mello-Leitão, 1922) – Brazil, Argentina
Arachosia carancho Rubio & Ramírez, 2015 – Argentina
Arachosia cubana (Banks, 1909) – USA, Cuba
Arachosia freiburgensis Keyserling, 1891 – Brazil, Argentina
Arachosia honesta Keyserling, 1891 – Brazil, Argentina
Arachosia kapiipeoi Rubio & Ramírez, 2015 – Venezuela, Brazil, Ecuador, Peru, Bolivia, Chile, Argentina
Arachosia magna Rubio & Ramírez, 2015 – Brazil, Argentina
Arachosia minensis (Mello-Leitão, 1926) – Brazil, Argentina
Arachosia monserrate Rubio & Ramírez, 2015 – Colombia
Arachosia oblonga (Keyserling, 1878) – Mexico
Arachosia pinhalito Rubio & Ramírez, 2015 – Argentina
Arachosia praesignis (Keyserling, 1891) – Brazil, Argentina
Arachosia proseni (Mello-Leitão, 1944) – Brazil, Argentina, Uruguay
Arachosia puta O. Pickard-Cambridge, 1892 – Panama, Brazil
Arachosia striata (Keyserling, 1891) – Brazil
Arachosia tungurahua Rubio & Ramírez, 2015 – Ecuador

See also
 List of Anyphaenidae species

References

External links

Further reading

 
 
 
 
 
 
 

Anyphaenidae
Araneomorphae genera